Custer Township is a civil township of Antrim County in the U.S. state of Michigan. The population was 1,136 at the 2010 census.

Geography

Demographics
As of the census of 2000, there were 988 people, 397 households, and 294 families residing in the township. The racial makeup of the township was 97.06% White, 0.51% Native American, 0.20% Asian, 0.40% Pacific Islander, and 1.82% from two or more races. Hispanic or Latino of any race were 0.51% of the population.

There were 397 households, out of which 29.0% had children under the age of 18 living with them, 64.5% were married couples living together, 6.3% had a female householder with no husband present, and 25.7% were non-families. 21.9% of all households were made up of individuals, and 9.1% had someone living alone who was 65 years of age or older.  The average household size was 2.49 and the average family size was 2.90.

In the township the population was spread out, with 23.5% under the age of 18, 4.6% from 18 to 24, 25.0% from 25 to 44, 31.4% from 45 to 64, and 15.6% who were 65 years of age or older.  The median age was 43 years. For every 100 females, there were 100.8 males.  For every 100 females age 18 and over, there were 101.6 males.

The median income for a household in the township was $41,645, and the median income for a family was $46,458. Males had a median income of $32,283 versus $22,356 for females. The per capita income for the township was $19,643.  About 4.1% of families and 6.3% of the population were below the poverty line, including 10.0% of those under age 18 and 8.3% of those age 65 or over.

References 

Townships in Antrim County, Michigan
Townships in Michigan